The Kyiv Academic Puppet Theatre is a theatre in Kyiv in Ukraine. It was founded on October 27, 1927. It is the oldest puppet theatre in Kyiv.

References

External links
Official site
Puppet Theatre (Kyiv)

Theatres in Kyiv
Event venues established in 1927
1927 establishments in Ukraine
 
Hrushevsky Street (Kyiv)